The Caress Stakes is a Grade III American Thoroughbred horse race for fillies and mares aged four years old and older held over a distance of five and one-half furlongs on the turf held annually in July at Saratoga Race Course in Saratoga Springs, New York.

History

The event is named in honor of mare Caress who won the 1995 Grade III Poker Stakes at Belmont Park defeating male horses and also won the Grade III Beaugay Handicap at Aqueduct Racetrack.

The event's inaugural running was on 25 June 2008 at Belmont Park in Elmont, New York as the third race on the race card over the seven furlong distance for fillies and mares aged three years old and older and was won by the Stormy West who was ridden by the US Hall of Fame jockey Kent Desormeaux and trained by US Hall of Fame trainer Bill Mott in a blanket photo finish by a head in a time of 1:21.29.

In 2009 and 2011 the event was run over a shorter distance of six furlongs. The event was not held in 2010. 

In 2012 the event was scheduled in August at Saratoga over the sprint distance of  furlongs.

In 2016 the event was moved off the turf due to rain affected track and held on a sealed sloppy dirt track.

In 2021 the event was upgraded in classification by the Thoroughbred Owners and Breeders Association's American Graded Stakes Committee to Grade III.

Records
Speed record:
 furlongs: 1:00.82 Thieves Guild   (2015)

Margins:
 lengths – Miss Ella  (2016)

Most wins:
 2 – Miss Ella   (2016, 2017)

Most wins by an owner:
 2 – Jack Swain III   (2016, 2017)

Most wins by a jockey:
 3 – Joel Rosario (2014, 2016, 2017)

Most wins by a trainer:
 2 – H. Graham Motion (2016, 2017)
 2 – James J. Toner (2015, 2019)

Winners

See also
 List of American and Canadian Graded races

References

Graded stakes races in the United States
Grade 3 stakes races in the United States
2008 establishments in New York (state)
Sprint category horse races for fillies and mares
Horse races in New York (state)
Turf races in the United States
Recurring sporting events established in 2008
Saratoga Race Course